Rebecca Julie Lingwood  (born August 1970) is the Provost and Professor of Fluid Dynamics at Brunel University London. She holds an affiliate position at KTH Royal Institute of Technology. Lingwood was elected a Fellow of the Royal Academy of Engineering in 2019.

Early life and education 
Lingwood studied engineering at the University of Cambridge and graduated in 1992. She was a member of Sidney Sussex College. She remained there for a doctoral degree (completed in 1995) in fluid dynamics before starting a Royal Society Dorothy Hodgkin Fellowship. From 2004, Lingwood was a research engineer and aerospace manager at the Begbroke Science Park.

Research and career 
Lingwood joined the University of Oxford as Director of Continuing Professional Development. She spent six years at Oxford before moving to the University of Cambridge as Director of the Institute of Continuing Education in 2009. She was made a Fellow at Homerton College, Cambridge. Whilst at Cambridge she worked with the Cambridge University Health Partners to create a University Technical College. In 2015, Lingwood was made a Professor of Fluid Dynamics and Vice Principal for Education at Queen Mary University of London. In this capacity Lingwood was responsible for supporting the achievement of all students as well as developing staff excellence. Her research considers the transition from laminar to turbulent flow in complex fluids.

In 2018 Lingwood joined Brunel University London as Provost and Professor of Fluid Dynamics. She holds an affiliated chair at the KTH Royal Institute of Technology. Here she investigates the boundary layers that are induced by rotating surfaces. These include Kármán’s rotating-disk flow. She delivered the 2019 Royal Aeronautical Society Lanchester Lecture. She was the first woman to deliver this lecture.

Academic service 
Lingwood was made a Fellow of the Royal Academy of Engineering in 2019. She holds an honorary fellowship with Kellogg College, Oxford. Lingwood is a trustee of the Daphne Jackson Trust. In 2019 she announced that Brunel University London would join the Cabinet Office Open Innovation Partnership. She is working with the University of Bath to review the effectiveness of the university senate.

Selected publications 
Her publications include;

 
 
 

Lingwood serves on the editorial board of Philosophical Transactions of the Royal Society.

References 

Living people
Alumni of Sidney Sussex College, Cambridge
Fellows of the Royal Academy of Engineering
Female Fellows of the Royal Academy of Engineering
Fellows of the Institution of Mechanical Engineers
Fellows of the Royal Aeronautical Society
Academics of Brunel University London
Academics of the Institute of Continuing Education
1970 births